Khosrowabad-e Faleh Gori (also Romanized as Khosrowābād-e Fa‘leh Gorī; also known as Khosrowābād, Khosrowābād-e Fa‘leh Korī, and Khūsrūābād) is a village in Bavaleh Rural District, in the Central District of Sonqor County, Kermanshah Province, Iran. At the 2006 census, its population was 127, in 24 families.

References 

Populated places in Sonqor County